Jennifer Shasky Calvery is the global head of financial crime threat mitigation for HSBC and a former director of the U.S. Treasury Financial Crimes Enforcement Network (FinCEN).

Education
Shasky Calvery holds a law degree from the University of Arizona College of Law. She graduated summa cum laude with an undergraduate degree in international affairs from The George Washington University's Elliott School of International Affairs, where she was also an All-American basketball player.

Career
Working to prosecute money-laundering and related crimes, she spent 15 years at the Department of Justice, including as an Organized Crime and Racketeering Section prosecutor, and two years as senior counsel with the Office of the Deputy Attorney General, through two federal administrations.

She was director of the Financial Crimes Enforcement Network (FinCEN) of the United States Department of the Treasury from September 22, 2012, until May 27, 2016.

During her tenure at FinCEN, while representing the Asset Forfeiture and Money Laundering Section of the Department of Justice, had been "considering seeking a guilty plea from HSBC" as early as September 2012.

On April 16, 2016, she announced she would be leaving the position effective on May 27, 2016, to join banking group HSBC.

References

External links
 
 HSBC article 

Living people
American women civil servants
Elliott School of International Affairs alumni
James E. Rogers College of Law alumni
United States Department of the Treasury officials
Year of birth missing (living people)
HSBC people